J. K. Rithesh (5 March 1973 – 13 April 2019) was an Indian actor and member of the All India Anna Dravida Munnetra Kazhagam. He was a Dravida Munnetra Kazhagam (DMK) Member of Parliament (MP) in the 15th Lok Sabha from Ramanathpuram constituency. In the Indian general elections of 2009, Rithesh received 294,945 votes to defeat his closest rival, Satiyamoorthy of All India Anna Dravida Munnetra Kazhagam (AIADMK) party by a margin of 69,215 votes. On 10 April 2014, he joined AIADMK as a primary member. He died on 13 April 2019, due to heart attack.

Early life and education
Rithesh was born in Kandy, Sri Lanka in 1973 before migrating to Rameswaram in 1976, where he was brought up. His father was employed in the agricultural sector and his mother is a housewife. Rithesh has two elder sisters, Shanthi and Mani. Rithesh married Jotheeswari in 2007 and has a son, Arik Roshan (born 2008). He completed Diploma in Civil Engineering at Mohamed Sathak Polytechnic College Kilakarai, Ramanathapuram district.

Career 
His first film was Kaanal Neer, directed by Chinni Jayanth. Rithesh had helped produce the project but the film failed to become a success at the box-office. His second film, Nayagan took an average opening at the box-office.

After the moderate performance of Nayagan, the actor announced several projects and started work on films including Thillu Mullu alongside another debutant Siddique, a film with Chinni Jayanth, Deivamagan and his home production, Thalapathy. As of 2019, none of these projects have been completed. He made his acting comeback with a negative role in LKG.

He was arrested in November 2011 in a land grabbing case. He was booked in charges of cheating a US citizen of Indian origin for promising him buying a land.

Death
Rithesh died on 13 April 2019, due to a heart attack at Ramanathapuram at the age of 46.

Filmography

References

Tamil male actors
Indian actor-politicians
India MPs 2009–2014
1973 births
2019 deaths
Actors from Kandy
Sri Lankan emigrants to India
Lok Sabha members from Tamil Nadu
People from Ramanathapuram district
Male actors from Tamil Nadu
Male actors in Tamil cinema